The Orthopaedic Research Society (ORS) is a professional, scientific, and medical organization focused on orthopaedic research. The stated mission of the ORS is to advance orthopaedic research through education, collaboration, communication, and advocacy. The ORS aims to raise resources for orthopaedic research and increase the awareness of the impact of such research on patients and the public.

The Journal of Orthopaedic Research and JOR Spine are the official journals of ORS.

History
In 1940, the Research Committee of the American Academy of Orthopaedic Surgeons, chaired by Dr. Alfred R. Shands, conducted a survey of its members which indicated that over 180 members were conducting some type of research. This finding prompted several musculoskeletal investigators to express the desire for having a forum to present and share their work. Dr. Phillip D. Wilson, a member of the Academy, along with several others, met in San Francisco and proposed the idea of starting an organization focused solely on musculoskeletal research. This idea gained unanimous support from the American Academy of Orthopaedic Surgeons at their Annual Meeting in 1951.

In 1952, the first meeting of the founding members of the ORS took place. At this first meeting, Dr. Philip D. Wilson created a draft constitution and set of by-laws for the fledgling society.  It was determined that the purpose of the society was to "encourage and coordinate investigation and research in basic principles or clinical problems related to the special field of Orthopaedic Surgery."   Due to the unexpected death of Dallas B. Phemister, MD, who had agreed to take on the role of chairman, the formal organization of the society was delayed.

1954 marked the first official meeting of the group at the Palmer House in Chicago under the Chairmanship of Wilson.  At this first meeting there were twenty-nine people in attendance.  Cultivating the relationship between clinicians and scientists while providing them with opportunities to come together and share ideas was the driving factor in establishing the society. "The close relationship of between clinicians and basic scientists would help ensure the prominent role of orthopaedic surgeons in delivering care to patients with injuries and diseases of the musculoskeletal system," explained Eugene R. Mindell, MD who served as president of the ORS from 1972–1973.

The ORS continues to grow and evolve. Membership has grown to more than 4,100 members from across the globe.  Once a role only held by surgeons, in 1982 the ORS elected Van C. Mow as the first PhD president.  Currently, Presidents are elected from each of the three disciplines represented in the membership: clinicians, biologists, and engineers.

ORS2025: Mission and Vision 
The ORS's 2022 - 2025 strategic plan (ORS2025) focuses on advancing musculoskeletal research and discovery to improve health. ORS2025 outlines four approaches to overcome musculoskeletal limitations in the world. The first approach is through research to strengthen the ORS as a hub for musculoskeletal research, and to increase its impact. Second, the ORS employs education to empower current and future ORS members to succeed in a dynamic research community. Third, the society relies on community work to increase its members access to research opportunities, and to cultivate diversity and engagement. Last, advocacy has been the cornerstone of the ORS's efforts in increasing awareness of musculoskeletal problems worldwide, highlight the impact of musculoskeletal research, and the importance of funding.

ORS Past Presidents 

2021     Peter Amadio, MD (current)

2020     Susan Chubinskaya, PhD

2019     James Iatridis, PhD

2018     Gloria Matthews, DVM, PhD

2017     Rick Sumner, PhD

2016     Farshid Guilak, PhD

2015     Mathias P.G. Bostrom, MD

2014     Mary B. Goldring, PhD

2013     Joan E. Bechtold, PhD

2012     Theodore Miclau, MD

2011      Brian Johnstone, PhD

2010     Clare M Rimnac, PhD

2009     Regis O’Keefe, MD, PhD

2008     David B. Burr, PhD

2007     Alan J. Grodzinsky, PhD

2006     Joshua J. Jacobs, MD

2005     Christopher H. Evans, PhD

2004     Steven A. Goldstein, PhD

2003     Stephen Trippel, MD

2002     Edward Puzas, PhD

2001     Thomas Brown, PhD

2000    Gunnar Andersson, MD, PhD

1999     Linda J. Sandell, PhD

1998     Dwight T. Davy, PhD

1997     Richard A. Brand Jr., MD

1996     Adele L. Boskey, PhD

1995     Thomas A. Einhorn, MD

1994     Gary E. Friedlaender, MD

1993     Bruce Caterson, PhD

1992     Timothy M. Wright, PhD

1991     Richard D. Coutts, MD

1990     Theodore R. Oegema, PhD

1989     Joseph A. Buckwalter, MD

1988     Dennis R. Carter, PhD

1987     Victor Goldberg, MD

1986     Jack L. Lewis, PhD

1985     Savio L-Y Woo, PhD

1984     Joseph M. Lane, MD

1983     Nelson S. Mitchell

1982     Van C. Mow, PhD

1981     Larry Rosenberg, MD

1980     Michael G. Ehrlich, MD

1979     Clement B. Sledge, MD

1978     Roby C. Thompson, MD

1977     Carl T. Brighton, MD

1976     Richard W. Stauffer, MD

1975     Richard Cruess

1974     Reginald Cooper

1973     Harlan Amstutz

1972     Eugene Mindell

1971     Melvin Glimcher

1970     Patrick Kelly

1969     Henry Mankin

1968     C.A.L Basset

1967     R.R. Calondruccio

1966     O. Donald Chrisman

1965     Michael Bonfiglio

1964     Paul H. Curtiss

1963     Jonathan Cohen

1962     Wukkuan F. Enneking

1961     Robert A. Robinson

1960     Ignacio V. Ponseti

1959     Robert D. Ray

1958     C. Howard Hatcher

1957     Charles H. Herndon

1956     Philip D. Wilson

1955     J. Albert Key

1954     Paul C. Colonna

Research Sections 
The ORS is organized into smaller communities of specific research fields related to orthopaedics, and the musculoskeletal system. Each section of like minded-peers promotes the interests of its members through various opportunities including, newsletters, social media outlets, etc.

The ORS includes the following seven sections:

 ORS International Section of Fracture Repair.
 ORS Meniscus Section. This group serves to highlight the significant interest on the meniscus by providing meeting and online venues for presentation and discussion of the latest research on the meniscus.
 ORS Orthopaedic Implants Section. The ORS is the most important research platform to bring together experts from various disciplines to foster the multidisciplinary interaction which is required to improve the quality of the implants, ensure that new implants are adequately tested at the pre-clinical stage, that implants are introduced carefully to the orthopaedic market and that the clinical outcome is appropriately registered.
 ORS Preclinical Models Section. This groups promotes education, collaboration, development, refinement, and critical evaluation of pre-clinical models of orthopedic disease and injury and to provide resources accessible to ORS members conducting animal studies.
 ORS Strategies in Clinical Research Section 
 ORS Spine Section. This section advances spine research and related sciences so as to improve patient care through basic, translational, and clinical research.
 ORS Tendon Section. The group promotes and provides an interactive forum for education, collaboration, professional development, and strengthen scientific exchange in the ORS membership and tendon research community.

Research journals

Journal of Orthopaedic Research 
The Journal of Orthopaedic Research is a peer-reviewed journal that is published in cooperation with John Wiley & Sons, Inc. The journal provides an essential forum for the orthopaedic community to share and communicate new information in the different research areas of orthopaedics, including life sciences, engineering, translational and clinical studies.

JOR Spine 
JOR Spine is a fully open access and peer-reviewed journal that was established by the ORS. The journal provides a platform to share original and innovative information focusing on basic and translational research of the spine. Publications in this journal include the following topics in spine research: ageing, biomaterials, biomechanics, bioreactors, degeneration, genetics, inflammation, pain, remodeling, tissue engineering, etc.

Partners 
The ORS's mission and vision statement for the year of 2025 highlights the importance of building connections and collaborations among various musculoskeletal research societies worldwide. For over 30 years, the ORS has been a member of various international societies to advance global orthopaedic research. In 1992, the ORS, Canadian Orthopaedic Research Society, European Orthopaedic Research Society, and the Japanese Orthopaedic Association launched the Combined Meeting starting an alliance among orthopaedic societies to advance and promote basic, translational, and clinical musculoskeletal research globally. Today, the ICORS includes other international societies including Australia/New Zealand ORS, British ORS, Korean ORS, and the Taiwanese ORS.

The ORS has been a member of other societies including AAOS (American Academy of Orthopaedic Surgeons), NIAMS Coalition (National Institute of Arthritis and Musculoskeletal and Skin Diseases), OREF (Orthopaedic Research and Education Foundation), Research!America, and USA Bone and Joint Initiative.

Awards, grants and fellowships

Abstract Driven Awards & Grants 

ORS New Investigator Recognition Awards (NIRA)

This award is geared towards early-career ORS members who are less than 5 years out from completing a residency (i.e., MD, DVM, or equivalent) or PhD at the time of submission of their abstract to the annual meeting. NIRA finalists will present their work in a designated session at the annual meeting, and awardees chosen for quality and presentation of material from their abstract.

ORS/RJOS Young Female Investigator Grant

Female trainees (residents, students, post-docs, etc) whose first-author abstract has been accepted for presentation at the ORS annual meeting are eligible for this grant. Recipients will be decided by a committee of 2 representatives from both the ORS Women’s Leadership Forum (WLF) and the Ruth Jackson Orthopaedic Society (RJOS) Scientific/Research Committee. The Grant Committee will consider scientific merit, relevance and impact of the presented work when selecting awardees.

ORS Travel Grants in Orthopaedic Research Translation

Clinical or translational research-based abstracts submitted by those having completed a clinical residency(MD, DO, DDM, DPT, DDS, DVM or equivalent) within the last 5 years will be eligible for this grant. The ORS Awards and Recognition Committee will determine grant recipients based on quality of work described in the submitted abstract.

ORS Outstanding Achievement Awards 

 ORS Adele L. Boskey, PhD Award
 Women's Leadership Forum Award
 Alfred R. Shands Jr., MD Award
 Arthur Steindler, MD Award
 Marshall R. Urist, MD Award
 ORS/OREF Distinguished Investigator Award
 Outstanding Achievement in Mentoring Award
Dr. Peter Roughley Award

ORS Travel Grants 

 Collaborative Exchange Grants
 IFMRS Travel Grants
 ON/ORS Education Grants
 3rd Herbert Fleisch Workshop Travel Grant

ORS Fellows 
ORS Fellows represent longstanding members of the ORS who have demonstrated exemplary service and leadership, substantial achievement, expert knowledge, and significant contributions to the ORS, its governance, and the field of musculoskeletal research.  Fellows are thought leaders and experts in their respective disciplines. Fellows also serve as role models in the ORS community and in the field of musculoskeletal research and exemplify the core values of the Society.

ORS Committees

Awards and Recognition Committee (ARC). The ARC's will review awards and select awardees; foster cross discipline collaborations and communications; support other activities and projects as designated by the ORS Board of Directors. 
Ethics Committee. The Committee assists in the review of ethical issues and questions raised by officers, board members, committees, the editorial board, sections, members, and staff.
Finance Committee. The Finance Committee provides financial oversight for the Society, including budgeting and financial planning, financial reporting and monitoring accountability policies.
Nominating Committee.
Publication Advisory Board. The Publications Advisory Board shall oversee the operations of the Journal of Orthopaedic Research (JOR), assist the co-editors in matters related to editorial policies, and advise the Orthopaedic Research Society Board of Directors concerning the operations of the journal. JOR's Mission Statement: The Journal of Orthopaedic Research is the forum for the rapid publication of high quality reports of new information on the full spectrum of orthopaedic research including life sciences, engineering, translational and clinical studies.

Research Committees 

Scientific Program Committee. The committee ensures that the latest, most innovative and novel musculoskeletal research is being presented at the annual meeting.
Topic Chairs. The Chairs are a sub-committee reporting to the Program Committee, selecting members to review abstracts for the Annual Meeting, reviewing top scored abstracts submitted to the Annual Meeting to create podium and spotlight sessions and NIRA presentations, providing recommendations for spotlight speakers, and serving on the NIRA review committee during the Annual Meeting and assist in selecting the NIRA recipients.

Education Committees 

 Career Development Committee. To encourage and foster the development of the new musculoskeletal investigators.
 Industry Alliance Committee. This committee will function as a forum for the exchange of information of mutual interest and benefit to the Orthopaedic Research Society membership, its board of directors, and the orthopaedic industry.
 LearnORS Committee.
 Innovation Network Leadership.

Community Committees 

 Diversity, Equity & Inclusion. To cultivate a diverse, inclusive, and engaged ORS community by increasing access and opportunities.  Ensure the incorporation of strategic objectives relating to DEI are incorporated into the society governance structure, initiatives, and programs.
 Membership Committee.
New Investigator Mentoring Committee. The committee encourages and fosters the development of the new musculoskeletal investigators.
LearnORS Committee. The Membership Committee's mission is to recruit new members, to retain current members, to initiate and facilitate communication between ORS and members, and to develop membership benefits.
ORS Ambassadors. ORS Ambassadors are dynamic leaders who represent the ORS in their state, region or country. They facilitate networking, professional development and collaboration in an effort to strengthen the ORS and musculoskeletal science on a local/regional level.
Women's Leadership Forum (WLF). The WLF mentors, fosters, encourages and inspires women in orthopaedic research at all stages of their career, and advise and support women on career and leadership opportunities in orthopaedic-related organizations.

Advocacy Committees 

Public Outreach Committee. The ORS Public Outreach Committee promotes the importance of musculoskeletal research and the need for increased, sustainable funding.
Scientific Communications Committee (SCC). The Communications Committee promotes the Orthopaedic Research Society (ORS) as the pre-eminent leader of musculoskeletal research across the globe. It seeks to advance basic, translational and clinical orthopaedic research within and outside of the ORS.
Social Media Committee. The ORS Social Media Committee utilizes online communication to inform the public on orthopaedic research, build community, and promote the mission of ORS.

ORS Scientific Photo Contest
Hosted by the ORS Scientific Communications Committee, the goal of the ORS Photo Competition is to use images to highlight musculoskeletal research.

ORS Basic Science Tip of the Week 
Hosted by the ORS Scientific Communications Committee, ORS Member Fred Nelson, MD creates a Basic Science Tip of the Week which, in their nature, highlight the mechanical or biochemical development that affect current basic science applications in medicine and surgery. Additionally, they highlight current terms and concepts that may appear on resident examinations (e.g.,OITE) and provide a glimpse into future developments that might come into clinical practice in the future.

ORS Investigator Interviews 
Conducted by the ORS Scientific Communications Committee, these Interviews introduce investigators from the ORS community which consists of 4,300 members representing over 48 countries including biologists, engineers, clinicians, surgeon-scientists, orthopaedic surgeons, veterinarians, and those in the field of musculoskeletal science and orthopaedic care.

References 

Medical research organizations
Orthopedics